Gabriella Lev is a theatre director, writer and performer. She co-founded the Theatre Company Jerusalem and currently serves as its artistic director. She has won many awards, including the Kipod Hazahav award for life achievement in fringe theatre, the My Jerusalem Award for contribution to cultural life in Jerusalem 2010, and the WIZO award.

In 2016 Theatre Company Jerusalem spearheaded the first International Festival of Jewish Performance Arts. The festival has now become an annual event.

Biography 
Gabriella Lev graduated from University of New South Wales where she majored in theatre in 1969. There she played many varied roles, including Gertrude in Shakespeare's Hamlet and Joan in George Bernard Shaw's Saint Joan.

In 1971 Lev attended the London Film School, where she joined an alternative theatre company, The Low Moan Spectacular and helped create El Coca Cola Grande in which she also performed. Lev performed in various theatres in the U.K. including the Hampstead Theatre Club, Greenwich Theatre, the Close, the Citizens Theatre, Glasgow, the National Theatre of Wales and Bristol Old Vic as well as appearing in various theatres in Europe.

Influences 
Lev was influenced by the alternative theatre scene in London in the 1970s where she first came into contact with such troupes as the People Show and practitioners such as Charles Marowitz.

In 1973 Gabriella Lev made aliyah to Israel, which had a great effect on her work. She participated in a 10-day workshop given by Andre Gregory and Jaques Chwat at Mishkenot Sha'ananim. This exposure to work inspired by Jerzy Grotowski influenced her artistically. Later she collaborated with Serge Quaknine a student of Grotowskis. Also in this period she first came into contact with the voice work of the Roy Hart Theatre and co-operated with members of the theatre particularly Barry Coglhan for many years. In her first year in the country she worked in various schools and community centres teaching drama.

Ensembles created 
Lev established the Odot Company which produced two original Israeli theatre pieces, Nashim Odot Nashim and Anashim Rakim. She later helped establish The Jerusalem Drama Workshop and was its director for three years. This establishment grew into the Theatre Company Jerusalem which she co-founded and today is its artistic director. The original works of TCJ have won much acclaim and recognition. The company has been invited to perform at many theatre festivals around the world.

Lev lectures and demonstrates the unique theatrical modes developed by her and her company in many universities and institutions of higher learning, both in Israel and abroad. Such as Yale University, Wesleyan University, the University of California in Berkeley and Harvard University.

Works

Initiated and co-created
Maaseh Bruria - with Aliza Elion Israeli, Ruth Wieder Magan, Joyce Miller 1982
Elef Ester VeEster - with Aliza Elion Israeli, Ruth Wieder Magan, Joyce Miller 1984
Al Mita Vemitot - with Aliza Elion Israeli, Mario Kutler, Joyce Miller 1989
Sara Take 2 - 1993
Sota - 1997
At Rosa's Café - 2004
Ahava Atika - 2010
Her Story - 2014
Mochot - 2014

Written and performed

Ester 1990
Shulem with Serge Ouknine, Ayellet Stoller, Avishi Fish, Gershon Weisfierer 2005

Directed
Even the Birds - by Aliza Elion Israeli 1987
Echoes of Prayer - with Ruth Wieder-Magan 1992
Are You Happy Already? - by Varda Ben Chur
Rondo - by Aliza Elion Israeli
Ancient Loves
Sait of the Earth by Dan Kedem
She רה texts by Agi Mishol and Dorit Weisman
Ben and Sara by Ayellet Solomon
Good Intentions by Rasel Dickstein
Impressions of Zelda texts by Zelda Schneurson Mishkovsky
Measure for Measure by Shakespeare
When a Special Child is Born
Three Queens and a Concubine texts from Samuel 1 and 2 Yona Wallach, Yoav Michaeli, Merav Meshulam
The Spotted Tiger by Yaakov Shabtai 2018

Reviews 
Lev's performances combine story telling, lecturing, and interactive dialogue with the audience. They have also been received with critical acclaim: In 2000, the Baltimore Sun praised her work Esther, based on the biblical queen, as "an extremely well-crafted Sunday school lesson."

References

External links
 The Judaic Nature of Israeli Theatre
 Interview with Gabriella Lev
 Seven languages on one stage :The play "Shulem" experience the Holocaust through art
 Shulem recalls the liberation from slavery in Egypt, remembering the Holocaust
 Theatre Company Jerusalem

Living people
Year of birth missing (living people)